Octopus: Sam Israel, the Secret Market, and Wall Street's Wildest Con is a 2012 non-fiction book by the Canadian author and journalist Guy Lawson. The book was published by Crown Publishing on July 10, 2012.

Synopsis
Octopus focuses on Wall Street trader Samuel Israel III, who attempted to commit hedge fund fraud by taking part in a "secret market" reported to have been run by the Federal Reserve. Lawson interviewed Israel for the book, commenting in an interview with CBS News that he was surprised at "how much truth there was to Israel's stories". The book covers Israel's attempt to save his company Bayou as well as his attempt to fake a suicide.

Reception
Critical reception for Octopus was mostly positive. Fortune magazine praised Lawson for going "out of his way not to pass judgment on his subject, simply letting him spin an outrageous but definitely movie-worthy tale". Rob Copeland of hedge fund magazine Absolute Return had a different take, calling the book "exhausting." "Unlike the best in the narrative finance genre, this is a beach read with too few UV rays—leaving the reader cold," he wrote.

References

Canadian non-fiction books
2012 non-fiction books
Bank fraud
Books about traders
Crown Publishing Group books